Efrat Anne Tilma (Born September 10, 1947) is an Israeli transgender activist, one of the first trans women in Israel and the first trans woman to volunteer in the Israeli police. A play based on her autobiography, "Made He a Woman", was written by Yonatan Calderon and played at Habima National Theatre. In 2019 Tilma was the first trans woman to receive an honorary citizenship from the City of Tel Aviv-Yafo.

Biography
Born in 1947 in a kibbutz in the Galilee, Tilma had struggles with the Israeli police, who jailed her — a person assigned male at birth — for dressing as a woman. After undergoing gender-reassignment surgery in Casablanca in 1967, she had to go through humiliating examinations ordered by the Ministry of Interior in Israel that were deemed necessary to change her paperwork to reflect her new gender identity.

In 2011, Tilma began volunteering in the Tel Aviv District of the Israel Police. Since Israel’s transformation on LGBTQ rights, Tilma has become an ambassador of the transgender community and the Israeli police and was awarded an official apology and special medal from Tel Aviv police district. Tilma also met with Israeli President Reuven Rivlin as part of an evening honoring members of the LGBT community serving in the security forces.

In 2016, Tilma served as a judge for the first Miss Trans Israel competition. The contest was won by Thalin Abu Hanna, who a year later played Tilma in a play about her life named "Made He a Woman".

Tilma had appeared in several documentary television shows in Israel and she lectures regularly to various audiences, including policemen and judges, on transgender history and current trans issues.

Tilma was honored as one of the BBC 100 Women in December 2022.

References

External links
 

1947 births
Living people
Israeli LGBT rights activists
Israeli LGBT writers
Transgender writers
Transgender rights activists
Israeli transgender people
People from Tel Aviv
Transgender Jews
Transfeminists
20th-century Israeli Jews
21st-century Israeli Jews
Israeli women activists
Jewish women writers
Jewish Israeli writers
Israeli police officers
Women police officers
BBC 100 Women
Jewish women activists